Rhys Angelo Emile Herbert  (born 29 June 2000), known professionally as Digga D, is a British rapper. He rose to fame in 2017 along with his UK drill collective 1011. His mixtapes Double Tap Diaries and Made In The Pyrex reached No. 11 and 3 on the UK Albums Chart, respectively. His third mixtape Noughty By Nature was released on 15 April 2022, debuting at number one on the UK Albums Chart. 

Considered to be one of the pioneers of the UK drill scene, he is the founder of his current record label, Black Money Records (BMR) and managed by Groundworks.

Some of his music videos have garnered attention among law enforcement, resulting in a Criminal Behaviour Order (CBO) taken against the collective, and he has been in and out of prison during the singles and videos' releases. Digga D was sent to prison three times before the age of 20.

Early life

Rhys Angelo Emile Herbert was born on 29 June 2000 in West London to a Jamaican mother and Barbadian father. Herbert's interest in music initially started at age 12 when he listened to Jamaican reggae and dancehall and subsequently started writing music. 

Herbert made his first song in 2011 at the Harrow Club alongside future 1011 associates M'Skum and Sav'O. Herbert was kicked out of secondary school (Chelsea Academy) in his eighth year after getting caught with cannabis and ended up not taking his GCSE's. He went on to release his first single, "Jumping", at age 14.

Career

2015–2017: Formation of 1011/CGM 
In 2015, he formed the UK drill group 1011 along with his friends in a local youth club in Ladbroke Grove. The group was named after the W10 and W11 postal codes, and includes members Herbert (Digga D), Yonas Girma, Micah Bedeau (Horrid1), Isaac Marshall, and Jordan Bedeau. They released several singles in 2016-17, including "Kill Confirmed", "Play for the Pagans", and "No Hook".

On 9 November 2017, Digga D and members of 1011 were arrested in a stop and search in which they were carrying machetes and baseball bats. 1011 claimed they were making a drill music video, but police stated they were planning to attack a rival gang, 12World. Digga and 1011 were convicted of conspiracy to commit violent disorder, sentenced to 1 year in jail, and given a Criminal Behaviour Order (CBO) in 2018. Four of the group's music videos prior to the CBO were taken down. However, they were noted to have already amassed over ten million combined views, and would soon be uploaded by fans to their channels, where they continued to get more views. The group rebranded as CGM, an acronym for Cherish God More.

2017–2021: Double Tap Diaries and Made in the Pyrex
Digga D did a freestyle for Mixtape Madness's Next Up?, which was released on 30 November 2017. The freestyle was certified silver by the British Phonographic Industry on 18 October 2019, making it the first Mixtape Madness freestyle with a certification. Rap critic Joseph JP Patterson described the release of the freestyle as having "stopped everyone in their tracks. Heads in the music industry began to turn, and they quickly found themselves in 'next to blow' conversations." Ethan Herlock of The Face wrote that the freestyle "demonstrated Digga D's distinctive flow and chest-puffing energy, heralding him as a standout MC in the increasingly crowded UK drill scene".

He released post-CBO-reviewed singles including "No Porkies", and "Who?", and had a Mixtape Madness Mad About Bars session with Kenny Allstar. On 17 May 2019, his debut mixtape, Double Tap Diaries was released. The album included the single "No Diet" which peaked No. 20 in the UK Singles Chart. Days after the mixtape release, he confirmed he was still in jail. The corresponding music video garnered 1.6 million views in five days, received a shout-out from rapper Stormzy, and the music was used in an Instagram video post by Zac Efron.

In July 2020, Digga D released the single "Woi", which gained widespread recognition worldwide. The single was nominated for "Song of the Year" at the MOBO Awards, and the editors at Complex listed it at the top of their list of best songs of 2020. In October 2020, the follow-up single was released titled "Chingy (It's Whatever)". On 24 November, BBC Three released the documentary Defending Digga D on BBC iPlayer, and had it later broadcast on BBC One on 27 November. On 4 December, his "Daily Duppy" was released on GRM Daily.

On 4 February 2021, the single "Bringing It Back" with AJ Tracey was released. The song topped the UK Chart's Official Trending Chart and debuted at No. 5 on the UK Singles Chart. On 14 February, the single "Toxic" was released, accompanied by the music video. On 25 February, the music video for the single "Bluuwuu" was released. His second mixtape, Made in the Pyrex, was released on 26 February 2021. Pyrex reached No. 3 on the UK Albums Chart and was noted for being the "highest charting project to date for a millennium-born UK rapper, and the highest-charting independent UK Drill project on the Official Chart so far."

On the 13 August 2021, Digga D released the single "Wasted" featuring ArrDee. The single peaked at number 6 on the UK Singles Chart. On 9 September, he released the song "2K17", which charted at number 26 on the UK Singles Chart. He also appeared on the single "Keep Talkin" with Sav'O and Horrid1 on 28 September. On 21 October, he released the single "Red Light Green Light", with the music video referencing the television series Squid Game. The single charted at number 17 on the UK Singles Chart.

2022–present: Noughty by Nature
Digga D's third mixtape, Noughty by Nature was released on 15 April 2022, including features from Rack5, Dodgy, Horrid1, Hotboii, AJ Tracey, Maverick Sabre, among others. The mixtape debuted atop the UK Albums Chart, becoming Digga D's first number one album. In July 2022, Digga D released two singles, "STFU" and "Frenches" with French rapper Timal. On 1 September, he appeared on the song "Goofies" with American rapper Babyface Ray. The same day, he announced the launching of his own record label Black Money Records (BMR). On 13 October, he released his first single on the new record label, "Stay Inside".

Artistry
Digga D's musical influences come from the British Caribbean community in West London and incorporates dancehall, bashment and rap in his style. The Face considered him as one of the pioneers of the UK drill scene. GQ called Digga D "the most influential British rapper of our time," noting his ability to continue rapping about the "harsh, competitive realities of young inner-city life" while also abiding by the rules of his CBO. Digga D said in the interview "I wouldn’t say I'm a pioneer of drill; I would say I'm a pioneer of changing drill. Other people made drill, I just took it to a place it's never been to before."

Legal issues

Criminal Behaviour Order 
Because of their arrest on 9 November 2017, Digga and 1011 were given a Criminal Behaviour Order (CBO) in 2018 that required the group to have the Metropolitan Police's permission before releasing any new music, forbade them from using London postcodes, and banning references in lyrics to real-life incidents and people. Four of the group's music videos prior to the CBO were taken down. However, they were noted to have amassed over ten million combined views before removal.

The conditions of Digga's CBO included being fitted with a GPS tracker on his leg and being made to check in with probation every three hours, as well as having to notify the Met police when he uploaded any songs or videos, within 24 hours of upload. Any releases that incited violence, mentioning certain areas of London or lyrical references to real-life incidents or people in their music would not be permitted. "There's a list of about 18 to 20 people that Rhys isn't allowed to associate with, most of whom make up his friends from school or friends from his area or people that the police deemed were part of a gang that he was part of", explained Digga's lawyer, Cecilia Goodwin. Moreover, visually, there are certain things which are not allowed to be portrayed. Any breach of the CBO would result in a recall to prison.

The CBO ban issued to 1011 was condemned by the campaign group Index on Censorship and widely described as entirely unprecedented. Digga's lawyer noted that the CBO "gives the police and probation the ability to control and censor his art". The Metropolitan Police has since denied it was censorship. Det Ch Supt Kevin Southworth said at the time: "When in this instance you see a particular genre of music being used specifically to goad, to incite, to provoke, to inflame, that can only lead to acts of very serious violence being committed, that’s when it becomes a matter for the police. We're not in the business of killing anyone's fun, we're not in the business of killing anyone's artistic expression – we are in the business of stopping people being killed."

While Digga was recalled to prison in 2019 for breaching the conditions of his CBO, Digga was stabbed in the eye, causing him to lose use of the eye. He was stabbed with a blade fashioned from a tuna can, according to an official at the Ministry of Justice who was not authorized to publicly discuss the matter and who spoke on the condition of anonymity.  Goodwin, his lawyer, said that the rapper had been struggling with post-traumatic stress disorder after the attack.

In March 2020 Digga D pleaded guilty to violent disorder again and breaches of his CBO. He was sentenced to two years and 6 months for his role in a machete brawl with rival gang members in front of shoppers in West London. Other members of CGM were also charged, including Sav'o, who was sentenced to three years' imprisonment after pleading guilty to violent disorder, possession of an offensive weapon and breaches of a CBO.

He was arrested again in July for inciting violence after attending a Black Lives Matter protest in London and posting about the movement on Instagram. Right after being released from his previous arrest, rumours circulated that police had taken the rapper back into custody, which was later confirmed. "Again they are on me", the rapper is heard saying in a video as he is being cuffed. "For what? No reason." He has since been released, still under conditions of his CBO. Asked in an interview with The Face if he was treated unfairly, he replied: "Oh, of course, 100 per cent, They didn't ban me from music [at first], only as it started hitting millions and [they] saw me prospering from it."

In November 2021, it was claimed on social media that Digga D was arrested for stabbing a man in Dubai. He responded to these allegations by saying in an Instagram post, "In [the] future, before you start adding your 2 pence, wait to hear the full story." He also stated that, while he was arrested, he did not face any charges and was released soon after.

Discography

Mixtapes

Singles

As lead artist

As featured artist

Promotional singles

Guest appearances

Filmography

Awards and nominations

Notes

References

External links
 

2000 births
Rappers from London
UK drill musicians
Living people
English male rappers
Gangsta rappers
People from Ladbroke Grove
English people of Barbadian descent
English people of Jamaican descent